The Republic of China Naval Aviation Command is the naval aviation branch of the Republic of China Navy. The ROCNAC's primary mission is to defend ROC territories and the sea lanes that surround Taiwan against an attack by the People's Republic of China.

Organization
Aviation Command (operates from Pingtung, Tsoying, Hualien, and Taoyuan AB)
Naval Aviation, Taoyuan AB Command, will receive 12 P-3C.
1st ASW Aviation Group
133rd Squadron: S-2T, at Pingtung.
134th Squadron: S-2T, at Pingtung.
2nd ASW Aviation Group
701st Helicopter Squadron (Light), S-70C(M)-1, at Hualien.
702nd Helicopter Squadron (Light), S-70C(M)-2, at Tsoying.
501st Helicopter Squadron (Light), 500MD ASW, at Tsoying.
Maintenance Group
1st Maintenance Squadron (Pingtung)
2nd Maintenance Squadron (Tsoying)
3rd Maintenance Squadron (Hualien)

Equipment and procurement

Aircraft

See also
Black Bat Squadron
People's Liberation Army Naval Air Force

References

External links 

 ROCN website
 Republic of China Naval Aviation Command

1977 establishments in Taiwan
Aviation Command
Military units and formations established in 1977
T